The JAC Refine R3 is a compact MPV produced by JAC.

Overview 

The JAC Refine R3 was revealed during the 2017 Guangzhou Auto Show with prices ranging from 64,800 yuan to 90,800 yuan. Refine R3 seats seven in a 2-2-3 setup and was positioned in between the Refine M2 and Refine M3. 

Power of the Refine R3 comes from a 1.6 liter inline-four engine with 120 hp and 155 Nm, the engine is mated to a five-speed manual gearbox powering the front wheels.

References

External links 
Official site - In Chinese

Refine R3
Minivans
Compact MPVs
Front-wheel-drive vehicles
Cars introduced in 2018